Dyspessa manas is a moth in the family Cossidae. It was described by Yakovlev in 2007. It is found in Kyrgyzstan.

The length of the forewings is 10–11 mm. The forewings are yellowish-brown with a narrow dark-brown border. There is greyish suffusion at the submarginal area and the postdiscal area is brown with a slight yellowish suffusion. The hindwings are brown with a light border.

References

Natural History Museum Lepidoptera generic names catalog

Moths described in 2007
Dyspessa
Moths of Asia